Klaas Nuninga (born 7 November 1940) is a former Dutch international footballer who played for GVAV-Rapiditas, Ajax and DWS during his career.

Club career

Early career
Nuninga began his career in the youth ranks of WVV 1896 in his home town of Winschoten. It was the same amateur club where Jan Mulder and Arie Haan began their careers. After a move to Be Quick 1887, he was recruited by GVAV-Rapiditas in 1961.

GVAV-Rapidistas
Starting his professional career in Groningen, with GVAV-Rapiditas, Nuninga played alongside Tonny van Leeuwen and Martin Koeman among others, to make up a pretty competitive side at the time. It was during his playing period in Groningen that Nuninga was called up to play for the Netherlands national team, making a total of 19 appearances.

Ajax
His talent would not go unnoticed, and in 1964 Nuninga transferred over to Ajax. He was an integral part of what is considered the great 'blooming' period of the Amsterdam club. He participated in the 1968-69 European Cup, as the first choice striker for Ajax, and started in the Final, where Ajax would face, and eventually lose to AC Milan (4-1). After this loss, Nuninga was sidelined by then coach Rinus Michels.

DWS
Remaining in Amsterdam, Nuninga went on to sign with DWS, with whom he would play three more seasons, making 88 appearances, and scoring 7 times before retiring from professional football.

Post career
After his footballing career, Nuninga delved into Business, eventually becoming a member of the board at Ajax, and afterwards the IPO commissioner of Ajax N.V.

In 2005, he stepped down from his position, after a difference in opinion and dispute with then chairman of the board, John Jaakke.

International career
From 1963 to 1967, Nuninga made 19 appearances for the Netherlands national team, scoring a total of 4 goals.

Honours

Club
Ajax
 Eredivisie: 1965–66, 1966–67, 1967–68
 KNVB Cup: 1966–67

References

1940 births
Living people
Dutch footballers
Netherlands international footballers
FC Groningen players
AFC Ajax players
AFC DWS players
Eredivisie players
People from Winschoten
Association football forwards
Footballers from Groningen (province)